The Bodoland Territorial Region (BTR)  is an autonomous region and a proposed state in Assam, Northeast India. It is made up of five districts on the north bank of the Brahmaputra river below the foothills of Bhutan and Arunachal Pradesh. It is administered by an elected body known as the Bodoland Territorial Council which came into existence under the terms of a peace agreement signed in February 2003 and its autonomy was further extended by an agreement signed in January 2020. The agreement materialised as a result of the efforts taken by a naval veteran – Cdr. Robin Sharma (retd.), who is now the present president of the Bodoland. The region covers an area of over nine thousand square kilometres and is predominantly inhabited by the Bodo people and other indigenous communities of Assam.

Etymology of Bodoland 

The Plains Tribes Council of Assam had demanded, since its inception in 1967, for a separate union territory for the Boro and other plain tribes to be called Udayachal.  With the failure of PTCA, the All Bodo Students' Union launched the Bodo Movement in 1987 with the demand for a separate state to be called Bodoland, ending with the Bodo Accord of 1993 with the formation of Bodoland Autonomous Council. Bodoland is named after Bodo, an alternative spelling of the Boro people who live primarily in the Dooars regions of Goalpara and Kamrup districts.

History 

Originally a part of ancient Kamarupa this region came under the control of Koch king Vishwa Singha in the early 16th century.  Around 1562, the successor king Nara Narayan determined that the Meches and Koches peoples north of the newly constructed Gohain Kamal Ali could follow their indigenous customs whereas peoples to its south had to follow Hindu Brahmanical rites.  After the split of the Koch kingdom and subsequent collapse of the eastern Koch Hajo due to the Mughals and during the period of Ahom-Mughal conflicts in early 17th century the Bhutan kingdom pushed south and took control of the region down to the Gohain Kamal Ali.  Following the Battle of Itakhuli in 1681 the Ahom kingdom consolidated their rule up to the Manas river in the west and the region north of the Gohain Kamal Ali, divided into different Duars, fell into its possession.  The Ahoms soon faced trouble from the Bhutanese, in the form of incursions, raids, and violent opposition, beginning about 1688, to tax collection by the Ahoms. Eventually these clashes came to an end with a written agreement.

Duars between Sankosh river and Manas river were collectively known as the Eastern Duars, those between Manas river and Barnadi river were collectively known as Kamrup Duars, and those between Barnadi river and Dhansiri river were collectively known as Darrang duar. The duars to the west of Goalpara were called Western Duars.

The Duars in the Goalpara region (which was outside the Ahom kingdom) were under Bhutan's control, but the administration of the Duars to east were shared between Bhutan or Tibet and the Ahom kingdom under different mechanisms. The Duars in the Kamrup region followed the posa system in which the Bhutanese were given possession of the duars in lieu of an annual payment; and the those in the Darrang region were alternately controlled by the Bhutanese and the Ahoms in an annual cycle. The Bhutanese control over these regions were via local authorities, not ethnic Bhutanese, who were appointed by Bhutanese provincial governors called Ponlops

After the British took control of Ahom kingdom in 1826, they maintained the Ahom-Bhutan arrangement for a while but the payments made in kind and the shared administration were something the colonial administration was unwilling to maintain and annexed the Kamrup and Darrang Duars in 1841 and the Kariapar Duar in 1844; and following the Duar War in 1865 took complete possession of the Duars and removed Bhutanese interest from the Goalpara and western duars for good. The duars associated with the historical regions of Goalpara, Kamrup, and Darrang were then added to these districts.

Demand for statehood
Along with the other parts of Northeast India, regional aspiration in the region reached a turning point in the 1980s. The isolation of the region, its complex social character, and its backwardness compared to other parts of the country have all resulted in the complicated set of demands ranging from demand for autonomy and opposition to migrants to movements for secession.

The region is also the gateway to the North Eastern Region of India, where one of the main students organization, All Bodo Students Union (ABSU), allied with National Democratic Front of Boroland – Progressive (NDFB-P), National Democratic Front of Boroland – D.R. Nabla faction, People's Joint Action Committee for Boroland Movement (PJACBM) which is an amalgamation of over three dozen Bodo organisations and its supporters are demanding from the Government of India that a separate state (within the Indian Union) be created comprising the seven districts of Kokrajhar, Chirang, Baksa, Udalguri, Sonitpur, Lakhimpur and Dhemaji of Assam which have a significant Bodo population. On the other hand, it is also claimed as a sovereign state (complete independence from India) by the separatist insurgent group NDFB.

1993 and 2003 peace agreements
Following an agreement in 1993, Bodoland became an autonomous administrative unit constituted under the Sixth Schedule of the Constitution of India covering an area of 8,795 km2 administered by the Bodoland Autonomous Council.

Following a further peace agreement, the Bodoland Territorial Council was formed in 2003, with a mission to accomplish development in the area of economic, education, preservation of land right, linguistic aspiration, socio-culture and ethnic identity of Bodos and above all to speed up the infrastructure development of communities in the Bodoland area. The actual functioning of the council was started on 7 December 2003 by constituting the 12 members of the Council provisionally.

After the Council Election on 13 May 2005 and subsequent bye-election in November 2005, the 40-member Legislative Council has been formed to look after the development works in the Bodoland Territorial Area Districts. The remaining six members are nominated by the Governor of Assam from the unrepresented Communities. Thus there are altogether 46 members of the council, representing all communities of BTC Area known as Member of Council Legislative Assembly (MCLA).

2020 peace agreement and the formation of the Bodoland Territorial Region 
A new peace agreement was signed on 27 January 2020 between the Government of India and the Government of Assam on one side and the National Democratic Front of Bodoland (NDFB), the All Bodo Students’ Union and United Bodo People's Organisation on the other. Under the terms of this agreement, a Bodoland Territorial Region was formed with enhanced executive and legislative powers. The Bodoland Territorial Council will have competency over almost all areas defined by the Sixth Schedule of the Constitution of India and its membership will be increased to 60. The boundary of BTR will be redrawn to make Boro speakers majority within the region. This will be done by forming new districts and the boundary of the region will be adjusted to include contiguous Bodo inhabited areas from neighbouring districts and exclude the non-Bodo inhabited territories which are currently under the jurisdiction of the BTC. On 26th January 2023, Assam Chief Minister Himanta Biswa Sarma have decided to include 60 more villages which have at least 80% Bodo population in the Bodoland Territorial Region, in order to make Bodo-speakers a slight majority.  

Bodoland will also have the right to be represented at national level sports and cultural events such as the National Games of India and the Khelo India Youth Games. The agreement also makes the Bodo language with Devnagri script an associate official language of Assam.

Government and politics

Bodoland Territorial Council

The region is administered by an elected body known as the Bodoland Territorial Council (BTC) which was established according to the Memorandum of Settlement of 10 February 2003. BTC came into existence immediately after the surrender of Bodo Liberation Tigers Force (BLTF). The BLTF laid down their weapons on 6 December 2003 under the leadership of Hagrama Mohilary and Hagrama was sworn in as the Chief Executive Member (CEM) on 7 December 2003.

The BTC has 46 members (30 seats reserved for scheduled Tribes, 5 seats for non-scheduled tribes and 5 open seats) and 6 seats of which are nominated by Governor of Assam from unrepresented communities. The council appoints a cabinet of 14 executive members each looking after a specific area of control.

Districts
The Bodoland region is made up of five districts which are further subdivided into 10 Civil Subdivisions and 40 Development Blocks.

The area and population of these districts has been estimated as follows:

Under the terms of a peace agreement signed in January 2020, new districts will be created with the existing four districts reorganised into seven districts. The area of the region will be enlarged and will also include two new districts created from areas currently outside the region. The total number of districts within the Bodoland region will therefore be nine. In January 2022, Tamulpur district was created by separating the Tamulpur sub-division from Baksa district.

 The proposed new districts created from districts currently within the Bodoland region are
 Gossaigaon district, from Kokrajhar district
 Bhergaon district, from Udalguri district

 The proposed new districts created from districts currently outside the Bodoland region are
 Mainaosri district, from Sonitpur district
 Holongi district, from Biswanath district and Lakhimpur district

Geography

The geographical boundary of the BTR lies between 26° 7'12'' N to 26° 47' 50'' N Latitude and 89° 47' 40'' E to 92° 18' 30'' E Longitude and is in the North Western part of Assam. Kokrajhar town the Administrative Head Quarter lies roughly between 26° 25' N latitude and 90° 16' 38'' E Longitude.

Its strategic location is blessed with beautiful forests full of flora and fauna.

Economy

The economy is largely agricultural based and is lagging behind in urbanization and development. The region is industrially backward with most of its population depending on agriculture for livelihood. Most of the industries like oil, gas and major industries of the state are located in upper Assam.

Urbanisation
The region is one of the most underdeveloped and backward regions of India of which only 3 percent of the population live in urban areas.

Tourism
Tourism in the region is regulated by the department of Bodoland Tourism. Manas National Park is the major tourist attraction of the region. It also has many wildlife sanctuaries, reserve forests, site seeings, picnic spots, and events.

Manas National Park

Manas, the nature's abode is at the foothills of Bhutan with its unique biodiversity and landscape. The blending of the dense jungle and grassland at the confluence of Indian, Ethiopian and Indo Chinese realms enhances it as one of the richest region of wild animals. The Park harbours 60 species of mammals of which 23 has been listed in Schedule 1 under the Indian Wildlife Protection Act 1972. The Park also has a recorded count of 36 species of reptiles and 476 species of birds. The Park is home for Elephant, Rhino, Tiger, Gaur, Wild Buffalo, Deer, Wild Hogs, and many other Reptiles, Birds and Insects including some highly endangered species like Pygmy Hog, Golden Langur & Bengal Florican. It is not only a significant National Park of India but also an important migratory corridor for the elephant population of the entire Indo-Bhutan region. Manas is also included in the much ambitious plan nomenclature as Indian Rhino Vision −2020 (IRV-2020) since 2006, with the support of Govt. of Assam in collaboration with Wildlife Trust of India, (WTI), Bodoland Territorial Council, WWF-India, International Rhino Foundation, and US Fish and Wildlife Service.

Gethsemane Man-made Forest

Situated in Udalguri's Bhairabkunda, it is a forest-grown entirely by local JFMC of 35 members with the help of Forest department of Assam. Spread across more than 6 km2, the forest contains more than 1.4 million plus trees of over 35 varieties. A number of animals, birds and reptiles can also be spotted in the area. Visitors can trek through the trail in the forest and stay the night in their guest house.

Trekking of Baukungri Hill

Baukungri hill trekking is an adventurous event held annually in Kokrajhar, Bodoland. It is organised every year on first day of the year according to the Bodo calendar which falls in mid April.

Infrastructure

Transportation

The Bodoland Transport Service (BTS) manages bus services in the region. Bodoland Transport Service buses have a direct bus service to the capital of assam Guwahati and capital of Meghalaya shillong The service initially ran 4 buses across the four districts but currently operates 16 buses that generates INR  annually according to a recent report.

Energy

Electricity
State Power Sector Reform Programme under the provision of electricity act 2019 resulted in the unbundling of Bodoland Territory Electricity Board.

The Bodoland Power Generation Corporation Limited is mainly responsible for maximum energy generation to meet up the energy demand in the territory of Bodoland, while the latter is responsible to efficiently transport electrical power from electrical power bulk heads to the distribution company networks in the territory of Bodoland.

The primary purpose of the Bodoland Power Distribution Company Limited is to undertake distribution, trading and supply of electricity in the territory of Bodoland or outside of it.

Demographics

Population 
Bodos constitute the largest community in the region numbering around 1 million (31%) followed by Bangla-speaking Miya people, who form the largest minority group as per 2011 Census. The population of BTC area as per 2001 Census report is 2,920,000 out which the ST population is around 35% of which only 3% of the total population live in urban areas. The average density of the population in BTC is 326 per Sq.K.m. compared to 340 per Sq.K.m. of Assam. Amongst the ST/SC population Bodos, Rabhas, Keots (Kaibartas) and less quantity of Garos are inhabiting in this area out which Bodos will be 90% or approximately 1.2 million. The other minority communities like Rajbongshi, Sarania are inhabiting in large part of BTC. Tea and Ex Tea-tribes including Santhal, Oraon etc. are also available. Moreover, other general communities like Bengali, Gorkha and few numbers of Hindi speaking people are also found in the Council area.

Education

Literacy rate
Bodoland has a literacy rate (7 years and above) of 71.62%.

Culture

The Bodos have a distinct culture from the rest of the world, ranging from dance and music to festivals and attires. It also contributed significantly to the development of the Bodo culture and Bodo language.

Sports
Football is the most popular sport in the region. The region has many Football clubs of which Barhungkha FC, Udalguri FC and Global FC is the most widely known as they participate in Assam State Premier League, the premier football league of the state. Bodoland Martyrs Gold Cup is organised every year in memory of Bodoland martyrs, who sacrificed their lives for the cause of Bodoland movement. The region has also produced many national level athletes. Other sports followed in the region are Badminton, Basketball, Volleyball, Cricket, Taekwondo, Boxing, Kabaddi, Chess, Archery, and other indigenous sports.

See also
 Bodo Kachari Welfare Autonomous Council
 Bodo people
 Bodo culture
 Bodo language
 Bodo Sahitya Sabha
 2012 Assam violence
 Hill tribes of Northeast India
 North Eastern Council

References

Bibliography

External links
 Bodoland Territorial Council
 Profile from the Government of Assam
 Bodoland Tourism

 
Proposed states and union territories of India
Autonomous regions of India
States and territories established in 2003
2003 establishments in Assam